Roman Safiullin was the defending champion but chose not to defend his title.

Ruben Bemelmans won the title after defeating Lukáš Rosol 6–4, 6–4 in the final.

Seeds

Draw

Finals

Top half

Bottom half

References

External links
Main draw
Qualifying draw

Challenger La Manche - 1
2021 1
Chall